Platyptilia resoluta is a moth of the family Pterophoridae. It is found in Taishan, China.

References

Moths described in 1937
resoluta
Endemic fauna of China